WFFC-LD, virtual and UHF digital channel 17, is a low-powered television station licensed to Midland, Michigan, United States. The station is owned by the DTV America subsidiary of HC2 Holdings.

History 
The station’s construction permit was initially issued on July 11, 2012 under the calls of W25ET-D. It was changed to KSET-LD on February 3, 2017 before the current WFFC-LD call letters were assigned on October 1, 2018.

On December 31 of 2022, Azteca America ceased operations.

Digital channels
As of January 1, 2023, the station's digital signal is multiplexed as follows:

References

External links
DTV America

Low-power television stations in the United States
Innovate Corp.
FFC-LD
Television channels and stations established in 2012
2012 establishments in Michigan